Harry Prosch (May 4, 1917 – March 11, 2005) was an American philosopher born in Logansport, Indiana.

Life
Prosch, the son of a grocer, was told he was ineligible to enter college because he had not studied Latin. "He was placed in the Industrial Arts program from which he graduated in 1935 and became an apprentice pattern-maker at a machine company where he worked for several years." He joined the army in 1942 and served in the Pacific in New Guinea and the Philippines as a supply sergeant.

Prosch collaborated with Michael Polanyi on several philosophical papers including Meaning, published in 1975. His book Michael Polanyi: A Critical Exposition was published in 1986.

Bibliography 
 Meaning (with Michael Polanyi, 1975)
 The Genesis of Twentieth Century Philosophy(book) (1964)

See also
 American philosophy
 List of American philosophers

External links 
 Obituary (PDF)

References 

1917 births
2005 deaths
People from Logansport, Indiana
20th-century American philosophers
United States Army personnel of World War II
United States Army soldiers